The 22965 Bandra Terminus–Bhagat Ki Kothi Express is a superfast train belonging to Indian Railways – Western Railway zone that runs between Bandra Terminus &  in India.

It operates as train number 22965 from Bandra Terminus to Bhagat Ki Kothi and as train number 22966 in the reverse direction, serving the states of Maharashtra, Gujarat & Rajasthan.

Later it was moved to Bhagat Ki Kothi station.

Coaches

22965 Bandra Terminus–Bhagat Ki Kothi Express presently has 1 AC 2 tier, 2 AC 3 tier, 14 Sleeper class, 3 2nd Class seating General Unreserved & 2 End-on Generator coaches. It does not carry a pantry car.

As is customary with most train services in India, coach composition may be amended at the discretion of Indian Railways depending on demand.

Service

22965 / 66 Bandra Terminus–Bhagat Ki Kothi Express covers the distance of 931 kilometres in 16 hours 55 mins (55 km/hr) & in 17 hours 05 mins as 22966 Bhagat Ki Kothi–Bandra Terminus Express (55 km/hr).

As the average speed of the train is above , as per Indian Railways rules, its fare includes a Superfast surcharge.

Route and halts

Schedule

Rake sharing

The train shares its rake with 22971/22972 Bandra Terminus–Patna Weekly Express.

Traction

Earlier, the train was hauled end to end by a Vatva-based WDM-3A locomotive.

It is now hauled by a Vadodara-based WAP-4 or WAP-5 locomotive between Bandra Terminus and  handing over to a Sabarmati-based WDP-4 which powers the train for the remainder of its entire journey.

References 

 https://www.youtube.com/watch?v=P-oqC5Vw4vE
 https://www.flickr.com/photos/amitshatabdi/5675452286/

External links

Express trains in India
Rail transport in Maharashtra
Rail transport in Gujarat
Rail transport in Rajasthan
Railway services introduced in 2009